Amir Bar-Lev (born 1972) is an American film director, producer and writer from Berkeley, California.

Bar-Lev is noted for his work in directing documentary films. He has directed such films as Fighter, a documentary film released August 24, 2001. The film received a Special Jury Citation in the 2000 Karlovy Vary International Film Festival. The 2007 documentary film My Kid Could Paint That was directed by Bar-Lev, and premiered at the Sundance Film Festival. The film was bought by Sony Pictures Classics in 2007.  He also served as co-producer of the
2009 Oscar nominated documentary Trouble the Water.  
Bar-Lev also directed The Tillman Story, which premiered as a Domestic Documentary Finalist at the 2010 Sundance Film Festival.
Bar-Lev directed Happy Valley, a film about the Penn State Jerry Sandusky Scandal. His most recent film, Long Strange Trip, explored the Grateful Dead.

Bar-Lev has taught documentary filmmaking at New York University. He lives in Brooklyn with his wife and three children.

Director/Producer 
According to IMDb Bar-Lev has directed or produced the following works: 
Fighter (2000) (director)
VH1: All Access (2003) TV series (producer) (unknown episodes)
Sundance Film Festival Dailies (2003) TV series (segment producer)
Katrina (2006) (TV) (producer)
It Could Happen Tomorrow (2006) TV series (producer) (unknown episodes)
My Kid Could Paint That (2007) (director)
Trouble the Water (2008) (co-producer)
The Tillman Story (2010) (director)
Happy Valley (2014) (director)
Long Strange Trip (2017) (director) – documentary about the Grateful Dead, executive produced by Martin Scorsese

References

External links
 amirbarlev

Amir discusses Long Strange Trip with Ira Haberman of The Sound Podcast

Living people
Artists from Berkeley, California
Berkeley High School (Berkeley, California) alumni
1972 births
Film directors from California
American documentary filmmakers